Vangueria apiculata is a species of flowering plant in the family Rubiaceae. It is found from Ethiopia to South Tropical Africa.

References

External links
 World Checklist of Rubiaceae

apiculata
Flora of Ethiopia